Codium geppiorum is a species of seaweed in the Codiaceae family.

It epilithic and is found in the intertidal and subtidal zones.

In Western Australia is found along the coast in Kimberley and Pilbara regions. It is also widespread throughout the Indian and Pacific Oceans.

References

geppiorum
Plants described in 1923